Infinitum Nihil is an American film production company, founded by Johnny Depp. The company is run by Depp's sister Christi Dembrowski. Depp founded the company in 2004 to develop projects where he will serve as actor and/or producer.

History
The Rum Diary, based on the novel by Hunter S. Thompson, was released on October 28, 2011, starring Depp as Paul Kemp in a screenplay adapted and directed by Bruce Robinson.

Dark Shadows was released on May 11, 2012. Depp stars in and produces this gothic film based on the Dark Shadows TV series; Tim Burton directs.

The Walt Disney Company has picked up The Night Stalker and a biopic of Paul Revere, both as possible starring vehicles for Depp. He will produce both films with Christi Dembrowski.

It has been announced that the company and Illumination Entertainment will co-produce a biopic of Dr. Seuss, with Depp slated to produce and possibly star.

On February 7, 2012, it was announced that the company will produce a film based on the memoir of the West Memphis Three's Damien Echols. The book (and subsequently, the film) will focus on Echols' experience on death row after being wrongfully convicted for three murders with two friends in 1993. Depp, who is a big supporter of the Memphis Three and proving their innocence, will co-produce the film with Christi Dembrowski, Echols, and his wife, Lorri Davis.

In October 2012, it was announced that Depp will start a publishing company sharing the name "Infinitum Nihil" with the production company. It will be part of HarperCollins, and according to Depp will "deliver publications worthy of peoples' time, of peoples' concern, publications that might ordinarily never have breached the parapet."

In January 2013, the imprint company released its first book, House of Earth, written by folk singer Woody Guthrie in 1947. 2015 saw the release of The Unraveled Tales of Bob Dylan by Douglas Brinkley, as well as Narcisa by Jonathan Shaw.

In August 2017, it was announced that Infinitum Nihil would produce a television series based on Funcom's The Secret World IP. In 2017, his production company signed a deal with IM Global.

Filmography

Bibliography
 House of Earth (2013)
 See Hear Yoko (2015)
 Narcisa (2015)
 The Unraveled Tales of Bob Dylan (2015)

References

External links

Film production companies of the United States
Mass media companies established in 2004
Johnny Depp